Walter Lynch (1896 – after 1922), also known as Ginger Lynch, was an English footballer.

Career
Lynch joined the original York City in 1914, which eventually disbanded in 1917. He played for hometown club Castleford Town Town before joining First Division side Bradford City in July 1920. He made four league appearances for the side before joining Raimes Viola in February 1921, as they finished the 1920–21 season in 11th place in the York Football League Division Three A.

He joined Welsh side Pontypridd in June 1921 and after a season with them joined York City for their first season in the Midland League in August 1922. He was a regular in the York defence, making 33 appearances for the side and scoring a goal in his last game, in a 5–3 defeat to Worksop Town.

References

1896 births
Sportspeople from Castleford
Year of death missing
English footballers
Association football central defenders
Association football wing halves
York City F.C. (1908) players
Castleford Town F.C. players
Bradford City A.F.C. players
Pontypridd F.C. players
York City F.C. players
English Football League players
Midland Football League players